Mirko Englich (born 28 August 1978) is a German Greco-Roman wrestler. He won two silver medals at the European Wrestling Championships in 2003 and 2008. Englich won a silver medal at the 2008 Summer Olympics. He defeated U.S.A's Adam Wheeler in the semi-finals to face Russia's Aslanbek Khushtov.

He was married to national champion Yvonne Englich, and they had two children. She died in 2018 of cancer at age 38.

References

External links
 

1978 births
Living people
People from Witten
Sportspeople from Arnsberg (region)
German male sport wrestlers
Olympic wrestlers of Germany
Wrestlers at the 2004 Summer Olympics
Wrestlers at the 2008 Summer Olympics
Olympic silver medalists for Germany
Olympic medalists in wrestling
Medalists at the 2008 Summer Olympics
European Wrestling Championships medalists
20th-century German people
21st-century German people